Maysky District is an administrative and a municipal district (raion), one of the ten in the Kabardino-Balkarian Republic, Russia. It is located in the east of the republic. Its administrative center is the town of Maysky. As of the 2010 Census, the total population of the district was 38,625, with the population of the administrative center accounting for 69.3% of that number.

Administrative and municipal status
Within the framework of administrative divisions, Maysky District is one of the ten in the Kabardino-Balkarian Republic and has administrative jurisdiction over one town (Maysky) and fifteen rural localities. As a municipal division, the district is incorporated as Maysky Municipal District. The town of Maysky, together with five rural localities, is incorporated as an urban settlement, while the remaining ten rural localities are incorporated into four rural settlements within the municipal district. The town of Maysky serves as the administrative center of both the administrative and municipal district.

References

Notes

Sources

Districts of Kabardino-Balkaria
